Pawang Nong (1874–1977) or his real name is Haji Nong Taib Bin Santan  was once the Royal Pawang of Pahang . He is also a follower and is said to have been associated with the famous warrior hero Mat Kilau who fought against the occupants once near Kampung Hulu Cheka @ Ulu Cheka, Jerantut, Pahang.

Biography 
He was born in Kampung Sempiat, Tanjung Besar, Benta Kuala Lipis in 1874 and died on November 10, 1977 in Kampung Ulu Cheka. His tomb can be visited at the grounds of Kampung Ulu Cheka mosque, Jerantut, Pahang. He has two wives and is blessed with 11 children as a result of his marriage, the first wife named Patam Mat Sama having 8 children (4 men and 4 women) and the second wife named Hajah Halimat Binti Mak Long and 3 children (1 male and 2 female).

Services 
A primary school in Kampung Ulu Cheka, Pawang Nong National School, was named after him in honor of his service. He was the founder or founder of Kampung Ulu Cheka with 7 of his friends on July 7, 1907. He was appointed head of the village until 1966. In addition he was the founder of the Kampung Ulu Cheka mosque and was the Pawang of the village and also a Royal Pawang.He is also the founder of the martial art medium in Kampung Ulu Cheka and the Warrior Melayu Pahang against the occupation communist military and Japan  in the area ini. He meeting among locals call it the title Aki We or Ancestor We.
His brother, Abu bin Santan, known as Bilal Abu also opened Ulu Cheka with him, and he was adopted in Ulu Cheka.

References 

 Pawang Nong Memorial Plaque
 Sinar Harian (June 2010 issue)

External links 

 Tradisi lisan di Malaysia
 Concept of a Hero in Malay Society
 Concept of a Hero in Malay Society
 Pawang Nong: "Bomoh" Hebat Bangsa Melayu
 Pawang Nong
 Kisah Pawang Nong

Pahang
Malaysian warriors
1874 births
1977 deaths